Bayview Cemetery may refer to:

 an historic cemetery near Mahone Bay, Nova Scotia, Canada
 an historic cemetery in Port Rowan, Ontario, Canada
 a cemetery in Ketchikan, Alaska, U.S.
 Bayview – New York Bay Cemetery, Jersey City, New Jersey, U.S.

See also
 Old Bayview Cemetery, Corpus Christi, Texas
 Bayview (disambiguation)